Smelling of Roses was a BBC Radio 4 comedy series starring Prunella Scales and written by Simon Brett. There were four series, each of six episodes, broadcast from 2000 to 2003. The series was produced and directed by Maria Esposito (some episodes were directed by Brett). Scales stars as Rosie Burns, manager of her own event management business in Brighton, "In Any Event". The series also stars Arabella Weir as Rosie's daughter Kate, Rebecca Callard as Kate's daughter Jo, Duncan Preston as Bob, the company accountant, harbouring unrequited passion for Rosie, and Annette Badland as Tess, the remaining member of staff, whose love life with her (unheard) partner Kevin is a recurring topic. Typically of Brett, intergenerational female relationships were the unifying theme of the series: Kate has just returned to England after a long spell working abroad during which she has left her daughter to be brought up by Rosie. The format of the show allowed different, and usually difficult, clients to appear in each episode such as the old disc jockey Kenny Truman (as played by Chris Emmett) and radio station Gleam FM in the Talking to One Person episode.

Episode list

References

External links
Smelling of Roses episode listing

BBC Radio comedy programmes
2000 radio programme debuts